Jack Anthony Ahcan (  born May 18, 1997) is an American professional ice hockey defenseman currently playing for the Providence Bruins in the American Hockey League (AHL) as a prospect to the Boston Bruins of the National Hockey League (NHL).

Early life
Ahcan was born on May 18, 1997, in Savage, Minnesota to parents Tim and Michelle Ahcan. Ahcan grew up in an athletic family as his father was an All-American forward at Gustavus Adolphus College and his younger brothers also play hockey. Ahcan played both baseball and hockey in Minnesota before choosing hockey full time following his junior year of high school. As a senior at Burnsville High School, Ahcan was a finalist for the Mr. Hockey Award as the "most outstanding senior high school boys hockey player in the state of Minnesota." At the time of his nomination, he stood at 5-foot-7 and led Burnsville with 23 points in 21 games.

Playing career

Junior
After graduating from Burnsville, Ahcan played one season in the United States Hockey League (USHL) for the Cedar Rapids RoughRiders. In his only season with the team, Ahcan recorded 15 goals and 32 assists and led all USHL defenders in goal scoring. As a result, he finished the 2015–16 season as the USHL Defenseman of the Year and was named to the USHL First All-Star Team.

Collegiate
Ahcan joined the St. Cloud State Huskies men's ice hockey team for their 2016–17 season. By the end of October, Ahcan was the recipient of the Bauer National Collegiate Hockey Conference (NCHC) Rookie of the Week after recording four points over two games, including the game-winning goal. He concluded the season leading Huskie freshmen with 21 points and was awarded both the Huskies' Roland Vandell Award as Rookie of the Year and named to the NCHC All-Rookie Team.

When Ahcan returned to the Huskies for his sophomore season, he increased his output and recorded 23 points in 40 games. Throughout the season he tallied 54 blocks on defense and had a season-high four blocks during a game against the Omaha Lancers. Growing on his sophomore season, Ahcan set a career-high in goals, assists, and points in 39 games. As a result of his play, he was named to the NCHC Second All-Star Team and West Second All-American Team.

In his final season with the Huskies, Ahcan served as team captain alongside alternate captains Clark Kuster, Jack Poehling, and Nick Poehling. When the season was cut short due to the COVID-19 pandemic, Ahcan signed a professional contract with the Boston Bruins of the National Hockey League (NHL) on March 26, 2020.

Professional

Ahcan joined the Providence Bruins of the American Hockey League (AHL) for their 2021 training camp and recorded his first professional point during a game against the Bridgeport Sound Tigers. Ahcan made his NHL debut on March 18, 2021, against the Buffalo Sabres. He scored his first NHL goal on March 10, 2022, against the Chicago Blackhawks.

Career statistics

Regular season and playoffs

International

Awards and honors

References

External links

1997 births
Living people
American men's ice hockey defensemen
Boston Bruins players
Cedar Rapids RoughRiders players
Jacksonville Icemen players
People from Savage, Minnesota
Ice hockey players from Minnesota
Providence Bruins players
St. Cloud State Huskies men's ice hockey players
Undrafted National Hockey League players
AHCA Division I men's ice hockey All-Americans